KXYZ (1320 AM) is a commercial radio station in Houston, Texas.  It is owned by iHeartMedia, and features an all-news radio format aimed at the African American community, as an affiliate of the co-owned Black Information Network.  In addition to carrying the national network, there are cut-ins for Houston-area news, traffic and weather.

By day, KXYZ transmits with 10,000 watts.  To protect other stations on 1320 AM from interference, it reduces power at night to 5,000 watts.  It uses a directional antenna at all times.  The transmitter is currently located in Pasadena, Texas.  However, iHeart has planned the relocation of KXYZ to the KPRC tower site in the Settegast neighborhood of Houston when the Pasadena site is sold. The move will require daytime power to be reduced to 8,400 watts and nighttime power to 2,800 watts.

History

Early years
In 1926, the station signed on, owned by Uhalt Electric. It broadcast as KTUE with just 5 watts on 1140, 1410 and 1420 kilocycles. In 1930, Uhalt sold the station to the Harris County Broadcasting Company, which changed the call sign to KXYZ and built a new 100-watt facility. In 1932, KXYZ absorbed another station, KTLC, and moved to 1440 kHz at 250 watts. Further increases to 500 watts, then 1,000, soon followed.

With the enactment of the North American Regional Broadcasting Agreement (NARBA), the station relocated to 1470 kHz in 1941.  When KTRH moved to 740 kHz, KXYZ took over the former KTRH transmission site, and began broadcasting with 5,000 watts on 1320.

Ownership changes
On June 17, 1948, the Federal Communications Commission approved the purchase of Harris County Broadcasting Company by Shamrock Broadcasting Company, owned by Glenn H. McCarthy. The Houston Broadcasting Corporation bought KXYZ in 1957.

During the 1960s, KXYZ was owned by ABC and played beautiful music.  The station was well known in the 1960s for its vividly descriptive station identification promos, such as:

"In Houston's downtown area, lifeless mannequins draped in the latest attire stand stiff and silent in the shops, which a few hours ago buzzed with the excitement of bargain-hunting shoppers... now relaxing at home to Beautiful KXYZ Music."
"The almost-deserted parking garage is lonely and unfamiliar to a late-staying office worker, whose footsteps echo as he walks to his car and turns on the radio. And the lonely feeling is dispelled by Beautiful KXYZ Music."

In the mid-1970s, the format changed to middle of the road (MOR) music.  Around 1980, it changed over to a Christian radio station after KXYZ was acquired by Slater Broadcasting the year prior.

Regional Mexican
In 1983, Infinity Broadcasting (later CBS Radio) absorbed KXYZ. Throughout the 1980s and 1990s, it was a Spanish language station, playing Regional Mexican music and was known as "Radio 13."   During this period, KXYZ carried Houston Astros and Houston Rockets games in Spanish. KXYZ then carried the Spanish talk format of satellite network Radio Unica.

In July 1998, Multicultural Broadcasting bought KXYZ from Infinity/CBS, and Biz Radio made its debut in the early years of the 2000s, carrying a business talk format.

Biz Radio left KXYZ for KTEK in Alvin, Texas. Multicultural purchased KTEK and began signal testing in November 2007 simulcasting with KXYZ until December 11, 2007.  KXYZ returned to Spanish language programming at that point.

Multilingual and BIN
On November 4, 2019, KXYZ began airing brokered programming in four different languages:  Texas Chinese Radio (Mandarin language); DTHT Radio (Vietnamese language); Radio Gracia (Spanish); DATT Performing Arts (Hindi language); Geetanjali Radio (Hindi); and Radio Me Hang Cuu Giup (Vietnamese).

On December 17, 2020, after the station was acquired by iHeartMedia, KXYZ flipped to the African-American oriented all-news radio format of the Black Information Network.

References

External links
KXYZ 1320 - Official Website

FCC History Cards for KXYZ

Radio stations established in 1926
XYZ
Black Information Network stations
All-news radio stations in the United States